Saha may refer to:
Saha ionization equation, relating the densities of atoms, ions, and electrons in a plasma
Saha Airlines, an Iranian airline
Saha District, a district of the city of Busan, South Korea
Saha Station, a station of the Busan Metro Line 1
Saha, Estonia, village in Estonia
Saha, Iran, village in Zanjan Province, Iran
Saha, Ambala, a village in India
 Saha (crater), a lunar impact crater on the far side of the Moon
 Sahā world, a concept in Buddhism

SAHA may refer to:
SAHA (Iran aviation), an Iranian aviation company
Suberoylanilide hydroxamic acid (SAHA, Vorinostat), an anticancer agent
San Antonio Housing Authority, a housing authority in Texas
Saha ionization equation, also known as Saha-Langmuir equation
Saskatchewan Amateur Hockey Association, now known as Hockey Saskatchewan
South African Hockey Association, the governing body of field hockey in South Africa

People
Saha (surname), a Bengali Hindu surname
Arthur W. Saha, Science Fiction and Fantasy editor
Louis Saha, French former footballer
Meghnad Saha, an Indian astrophysicist
Wriddhiman Saha, Indian cricketer
Ranadaprasad Saha, Bengali Businessman, Social activist
Gopinath Saha, Bengali activist for Indian independence
Arun Saha, Bangladeshi actor and musician
Surjit Saha, Indian television actor and model
Arati Saha (1940–1994), Indian long distance swimmer

See also
Sakha (disambiguation)